The list of shipwrecks in August 1886 includes ships sunk, foundered, grounded, or otherwise lost during August 1886.

1 August

2 August

8 August

9 August

12 August

13 August

16 August

18 August

19 August

20 August

21 August

22 August

23 August

27 August

28 August

29 August

31 August

Unknown date

References

1886-08
Maritime incidents in August 1886